The 2016 United States House of Representatives election in Wyoming was held on November 8, 2016 to elect the U.S. representative from Wyoming's at-large congressional district, who would represent the state of Wyoming in the 115th United States Congress. The election coincided with the 2016 U.S. presidential election, as well as other elections to the House of Representatives, elections to the United States Senate and various state and local elections. Incumbent Republican Cynthia Lummis decided to retire instead of seeking a fifth term. Liz Cheney was elected to the seat to succeed Lummis.

The filing period for candidates lasted from May 12 to 27, 2016, and the primaries were held on August 16. Republican attorney Liz Cheney, daughter of former Vice President of the United States Dick Cheney, and Democratic energy executive Ryan Greene won their respective primaries.

Republican primary

Candidates

Declared
Heath Beaudry, banker
Liz Cheney, attorney, daughter of former Vice President Dick Cheney, and candidate for the U.S. Senate in 2014
Leland Christensen, State Senator, former Teton County Commissioner
Mike Konsmo, professor at Northwest College
Paul Paad, trucking executive
Jason Senteney, corrections officer at the Wyoming Medium Correctional Institution and candidate for this seat in 2014
Darin Smith, attorney and Christian Broadcasting Network executive
Tim Stubson, Speaker pro tempore of the Wyoming House of Representatives

Withdrew
Darek Farmer (running for State Senate)
Charlie Tyrrel, restaurant owner
Rex Rammell, independent candidate for the U.S. Senate from Idaho in 2008, candidate for Governor of Idaho in 2010 and candidate for the Idaho House of Representatives in 2012 (endorsed Darin Smith)

Declined
Rosie Berger, Majority Leader of the Wyoming House of Representatives
Mark Gordon, state treasurer
Taylor Haynes, physician, write-in candidate for governor in 2010 and candidate for governor in 2014
Cynthia Lummis, incumbent U.S. Representative
Matt Mead, Governor of Wyoming
Rita Meyer, former state auditor and candidate for governor in 2010
Ed Murray, Secretary of State of Wyoming

Endorsements

Polling

Results

Democratic primary

Candidates

Declared
Ryan Greene, energy executive
Charlie Hardy, Democratic nominee for the U.S. Senate in 2014

Withdrew
Richard Grayson, Democratic nominee for this seat in 2014

Endorsements

Results

Third party and independent primaries

Libertarian

Candidates

Declared
Lawrence Gerard Struempf

Results

Constitution

Candidates

Declared
Daniel Clyde Cummings, nominee for the U.S. House in 2012 and 2014

Results

General election

Fundraising

Predictions

Polling

Endorsements

Results

See also

United States House of Representatives elections, 2016
United States elections, 2016

References

External links
Official campaign websites
Liz Cheney for U.S. Congress
Ryan Greene for U.S. Congress

Wyoming
2016
United States House